Mauricio Rodriguez Silva (born October 25, 1959), known as The Monster, is an American serial killer who killed three people, including his half-sister, during a May 1984 crime spree that spread across California, shortly after being paroled from serving a manslaughter conviction. He was convicted of the latter crimes and sentenced to death and is currently awaiting execution.

Early life
Mauricio Rodriguez Silva was born on October 25, 1959, in Los Angeles. He was the elder of two sons born to David Silva, an itinerant laborer from Chihuahua, Mexico, and his Nicaraguan wife Myrne Rodríguez, who suffered from gigantism and unspecified mental abnormalities. Mauricio inherited his mother's condition, in addition to being born with a cleft palate and other physical defects. His father, a prolific womanizer, abandoned the family when Silva was still young and was later killed by a colleague working in Alaska. Not long after, his mother left both children to the care of their grandmother in Mexico City, while she had an affair with her boss, with whom she had a daughter she named Martha Kitzler.

While residing with his grandmother, Silva and his brother were neglected – according to court records, she locked them outside of the house, and they had to resort to eating a pumpkin for days, for which they had to undergo treatment in the hospital for stomach infections. Silva eventually ran away and joined a gang of homeless children, where he started inhaling glue and eating scraps of garbage to survive. During this time, he claimed to have seen several of his friends and acquaintances be sexually assaulted by older men but was too afraid to notify the authorities.

For the remainder of his teenage years, Silva was transferred to and from various foster homes in the United States and Mexico. He did not know how to write and had trouble interacting with others. He was sent to the White Memorial Hospital to undergo an operation that would fix his cleft palate.

First murder and imprisonment
In 1978, the 15-year-old Silva got into an argument with an acquaintance, 18-year-old Troy Allison Covella. For reasons unclear, he pulled out a gun and shot Covella nine times, killing him. Silva was quickly arrested and charged with the murder, but he accepted a plea deall that had the charges reduced to voluntary manslaughter. He was convicted of the charge and sentenced to 5 1/5 years of imprisonment, which he spent at the Soledad State Prison in Soledad.

Release and killing spree
After serving out his sentence, Silva was released on May 7, 1984, after which he moved in to live with his half-sister and some relatives at their apartment in Hollywood.

On May 18, Silva was riding on a bus when he encountered 16-year-old Walter P. Sanders, a runaway from Lompoc, whom he proceeded to shoot five times with a shotgun in the Mojave Desert and then dumped his body in a rural area of the Antelope Valley. Six days later, Silva picked up 16-year-old Monique Michelle Hilton, a runaway from Illinois who hitchhiked to Hollywood to meet Michael Jackson, at a bus stop in Santa Monica Boulevard. Instead of driving her to her intended destination, he shot her twice and dumped her body near the Palmdale Regional Airport. Just four days later, Silva went back to Kitzler's, his half-sibling, apartment in Hollywood, where he strangled, stabbed her eight times, and slit her throat. Soon after Kitzler's body was discovered, an arrest warrant was issued for Silva, who went on the run.

Confession, trial and sentence
On May 28, Silva went to the sheriff's department in Templeton and confessed to the two deputies present that he was wanted for murder and wanted to turn himself in. After looking into his claims, the deputies realized that a warrant had been issued for his arrest and immediately detained him. Upon impounding and inspecting the insides of his truck, they found a loaded sawed-off shotgun and a knife. Later that same day, Silva was extradited to Los Angeles to face murder charges in Kitzler's death. He was eventually charged with two additional counts of murder concerning the murders of Sanders and Hilton but pleaded not guilty on all three counts.

Silva's attorney offered a plea deal to the prosecutors that would allow his client to plead guilty and receive a sentence of life imprisonment without parole, but this was rejected by District Attorney Lonnie Felker, who said that Silva's actions warranted the death penalty. Silva was eventually found guilty on all counts, with his lawyers attempting to present mitigating circumstances by claiming that the killings were done on impulse and that Silva's horrible upbringing greatly affected his mental state. The case eventually resulted in a hung jury, and a mistrial was declared to the great dissatisfaction of Felker, who complained that the defense had used a loophole in the law to garner sympathy for the defendant by showing photographs of his early life and relatives to the jurors. As a result, a re-sentencing trial was scheduled for mid-November 1985.

For unclear reasons, the trial was delayed until early 1986, when Silva was retried for the three murders. The only new testimony presented at the second trial was claimed by the prosecutors that he may have raped Kitzler and that he had supposedly told the arresting police officers that he wanted to plead guilty and receive the death sentence to "get it over with." As a result, Silva was found guilty on all counts and was ultimately sentenced to death.

Aftermath
In 2001, the Supreme Court of California nullified Silva's death sentence because the prosecution had erroneously excused a Latino juror, identified only as "Jose M.", on the grounds of his race. This claim was contended by Felker, who said that he had excused the man for being aggressive and for fearing that he would be in favor of a life sentence without parole. The death sentence was later reinstated, and Silva was returned to death row.

As of August 2022, Silva remains on death row and awaits execution. He has stated in several interviews that while he acknowledges that he is guilty, he will fight to have his sentence reduced to life without parole, arguing that he would suffer more by being left alive rather than executed. During these interviews, he has repeatedly emphasized that young men and women should speak up about their experiences with sexual abuse to prevent themselves from becoming like him.

See also
 Capital punishment in California
 List of death row inmates in California
 List of serial killers in the United States

References

External links
 People v. Silva (2001)
 Birth Index

1959 births
20th-century American criminals
American male criminals
American murderers of children
American people convicted of manslaughter
American people convicted of murder
American people of Mexican descent
American people of Nicaraguan descent
American prisoners sentenced to death
American serial killers
Criminals from Los Angeles
Living people
Male serial killers
Minors convicted of murder
People convicted of murder by California
Prisoners sentenced to death by California
People with gigantism
People with speech impediment